Pigot, Pigott or Piggott may refer to:

People 
 Pigot (surname),  including a list of people with this name
 Pigott (surname), including a list of people with the surname Pigott or Piggott

Places 
 Piggott, Arkansas, United States, a city
 Piggott Peninsula, Antarctica 
 Pigott Street, London
 10220 Pigott, an asteroid

Other uses 
 HM galley Pigot, two Royal Navy vessels
 Pigot (East Indiaman), two British East India Company vessels
 Pigot baronets, a title in the Baronetage of Great Britain
 Pigott baronets, a title in the Baronetage of the United Kingdom
 Pigot's Directory, a British directory first published in 1814
 Pigot Diamond, a famous diamond
 The Piggott School, a Church of England academy secondary school in Twyford, Berkshire, England
 Piggott High School, Pigott, Arkansas

See also 
 Pigott's Building, a heritage-listed department store in Toowoomba, Queensland
 Piggotts, a small township in Antigua 
 Abington Pigotts, a village in Cambridgeshire, England
 Acton Pigott, Shropshire
 Aston Pigott, a hamlet in Shropshire, England